The UEFA European Championship is the main football competition of the men's national teams governed by UEFA (the Union of European Football Associations). Held every four years since 1960, in the even-numbered year between World Cup tournaments, it was originally called the UEFA European Nations' Cup, changing to the current name in 1968. Starting with the 1996 tournament, specific championships are often referred to in the form "Euro 2008" or whichever year is appropriate. Prior to entering the tournament, all teams other than the host nations (which qualify automatically) compete in a qualifying process.

Spain have participated in eleven European Championships, from which they won three titles. Spain became European champions as hosts in 1964, in 2008 in Austria and Switzerland, and in 2012 in Poland and Ukraine.

Overall record

1964 European Nations' Cup

Final tournament

Semi-finals

Final

Euro 1980

Group stage

Euro 1984

Group stage

Knockout stage

Semi-finals

Final

Euro 1988

Group stage

Euro 1996

Group stage

Knockout stage

Quarter-finals

Euro 2000

Group stage

Knockout stage

Quarter-finals

Euro 2004

Group stage

Euro 2008

Group stage

Knockout phase

Quarter-finals

Semi-finals

Final

Euro 2012

Group stage

Knockout phase

Quarter-finals

Semi-finals

Final

Euro 2016

Group stage

Knockout phase

Round of 16

Euro 2020

Group stage

Knockout phase

Round of 16

Quarter-finals

Semi-finals

Goalscorers

Notes

References 

 
Countries at the UEFA European Championship
Euro